This page lists all described species of the spider family Cycloctenidae accepted by the World Spider Catalog :

Cycloctenus

Cycloctenus L. Koch, 1878
 C. abyssinus Urquhart, 1890 — Australia (New South Wales)
 C. agilis Forster, 1979 — New Zealand
 C. centralis Forster, 1979 — New Zealand
 C. cryptophilus Hickman, 1981 — Australia (Tasmania)
 C. duplex Forster, 1979 — New Zealand
 C. fiordensis Forster, 1979 — New Zealand
 C. flaviceps L. Koch, 1878 (type) — Australia
 C. flavus Hickman, 1981 — Australia (Tasmania)
 C. fugax Goyen, 1890 — New Zealand
 C. infrequens Hickman, 1981 — Australia (Tasmania)
 C. lepidus Urquhart, 1890 — New Zealand
 C. montivagus Hickman, 1981 — Australia (Tasmania)
 C. nelsonensis Forster, 1979 — New Zealand
 C. paturau Forster, 1979 — New Zealand
 C. pulcher Urquhart, 1891 — New Zealand
 C. robustus (L. Koch, 1878) — Australia (New South Wales)
 C. westlandicus Forster, 1964 — New Zealand

Galliena

Galliena Simon, 1898
 G. montigena Simon, 1898 (type) — Indonesia (Java)

Orepukia

Orepukia Forster & Wilton, 1973
 O. alta Forster & Wilton, 1973 — New Zealand
 O. catlinsensis Forster & Wilton, 1973 — New Zealand
 O. dugdalei Forster & Wilton, 1973 — New Zealand
 O. egmontensis Forster & Wilton, 1973 — New Zealand
 O. florae Forster & Wilton, 1973 — New Zealand
 O. geophila Forster & Wilton, 1973 — New Zealand
 O. grisea Forster & Wilton, 1973 — New Zealand
 O. insula Forster & Wilton, 1973 — New Zealand
 O. nota Forster & Wilton, 1973 — New Zealand
 O. nummosa (Hogg, 1909) — New Zealand
 O. orophila Forster & Wilton, 1973 — New Zealand
 O. pallida Forster & Wilton, 1973 — New Zealand
 O. poppelwelli Forster & Wilton, 1973 — New Zealand
 O. prina Forster & Wilton, 1973 — New Zealand
 O. rakiura Forster & Wilton, 1973 — New Zealand
 O. redacta Forster & Wilton, 1973 — New Zealand
 O. riparia Forster & Wilton, 1973 — New Zealand
 O. sabua Forster & Wilton, 1973 — New Zealand
 O. similis Forster & Wilton, 1973 — New Zealand
 O. simplex Forster & Wilton, 1973 — New Zealand
 O. sorenseni Forster & Wilton, 1973 (type) — New Zealand
 O. tanea Forster & Wilton, 1973 — New Zealand
 O. tonga Forster & Wilton, 1973 — New Zealand
 O. virtuta Forster & Wilton, 1973 — New Zealand

Pakeha

Pakeha Forster & Wilton, 1973
 P. buechlerae Forster & Wilton, 1973 — New Zealand
 P. duplex Forster & Wilton, 1973 — New Zealand
 P. hiloa Forster & Wilton, 1973 — New Zealand
 P. inornata Forster & Wilton, 1973 — New Zealand
 P. insignita Forster & Wilton, 1973 — New Zealand
 P. kirki (Hogg, 1909) — New Zealand (Snares Is.)
 P. lobata Forster & Wilton, 1973 — New Zealand
 P. manapouri Forster & Wilton, 1973 — New Zealand
 P. maxima Forster & Wilton, 1973 — New Zealand
 P. media Forster & Wilton, 1973 — New Zealand
 P. minima Forster & Wilton, 1973 — New Zealand
 P. paratecta Forster & Wilton, 1973 — New Zealand
 P. parrotti Forster & Wilton, 1973 — New Zealand
 P. protecta Forster & Wilton, 1973 (type) — New Zealand
 P. pula Forster & Wilton, 1973 — New Zealand
 P. stewartia Forster & Wilton, 1973 — New Zealand
 P. subtecta Forster & Wilton, 1973 — New Zealand
 P. tecta Forster & Wilton, 1973 — New Zealand

Paravoca

Paravoca Forster & Wilton, 1973
 P. opaca Forster & Wilton, 1973 — New Zealand
 P. otagoensis Forster & Wilton, 1973 (type) — New Zealand

Plectophanes

Plectophanes Bryant, 1935
 P. altus Forster, 1964 — New Zealand
 P. archeyi Forster, 1964 — New Zealand
 P. frontalis Bryant, 1935 (type) — New Zealand
 P. hollowayae Forster, 1964 — New Zealand
 P. pilgrimi Forster, 1964 — New Zealand

Toxopsiella

Toxopsiella Forster, 1964
 T. alpina Forster, 1964 — New Zealand
 T. australis Forster, 1964 — New Zealand
 T. centralis Forster, 1964 — New Zealand
 T. dugdalei Forster, 1964 — New Zealand
 T. horningi Forster, 1979 — New Zealand
 T. lawrencei Forster, 1964 (type) — New Zealand
 T. medialis Forster, 1964 — New Zealand
 T. minuta Forster, 1964 — New Zealand
 T. nelsonensis Forster, 1979 — New Zealand
 T. orientalis Forster, 1964 — New Zealand
 T. parrotti Forster, 1964 — New Zealand
 T. perplexa Forster, 1964 — New Zealand

Uzakia

Uzakia Koçak & Kemal, 2008
 U. unica (Forster, 1970) (type) — New Zealand

References

Cycloctenidae